The South China field mouse (Apodemus draco)  is a species of rodent in the family Muridae.
It is found in China, India, and Myanmar.

References

Rats of Asia
Rodents of China
Rodents of India
Rodents of Myanmar
Apodemus
Mammals described in 1900
Taxa named by Gerald Edwin Hamilton Barrett-Hamilton
Taxonomy articles created by Polbot